Bahlgerd (also Romanized as Behalgird, Bālgerd, and Beḩalgerd; also known as Bāgh-e Bahlgerd) is a village in Baqeran Rural District, in the Central District of Birjand County, South Khorasan Province, Iran. At the 2006 census, its population was 203, in 64 families.

References 

Populated places in Birjand County